WJKY (1060 AM) is a radio station broadcasting a Sports radio format. It is licensed to Jamestown, Kentucky, United States, and serving the Russell County, Kentucky area, including Jamestown and Russell Springs. The station is owned by Lake Cumberland Broadcasters and is affiliated with ESPN Radio.

The station is a sister station to WJRS FM radio, and the two stations share its broadcast facilities and transmitter located 2804 South US 127 on the south side of Russell Springs.

References

External links 

ESPN Radio stations
JKY
Radio stations established in 1967
Jamestown, Kentucky
1967 establishments in Kentucky